Ecpyrrhorrhoe is a genus of moths of the family Crambidae.

Species
Ecpyrrhorrhoe aduncis Gao, Zhang & Wang, 2013
Ecpyrrhorrhoe angustivalvaris Gao, Zhang & Wang, 2013
Ecpyrrhorrhoe biaculeiformis Zhang, Li & Wang in Zhang, Li & Wang, 2004
Ecpyrrhorrhoe celatalis (Walker, 1859)
Ecpyrrhorrhoe diffusalis (Guenée, 1854)
Ecpyrrhorrhoe digitaliformis Zhang, Li & Wang in Zhang, Li & Wang, 2004
Ecpyrrhorrhoe dissimilis (Yamanaka, 1958)
Ecpyrrhorrhoe multispinalis Gao, Zhang & Wang, 2013
Ecpyrrhorrhoe puralis (South in Leech & South, 1901)
Ecpyrrhorrhoe rubiginalis (Hübner, 1796)
Ecpyrrhorrhoe ruidispinalis Zhang, Li & Wang, 2004

References

 , 2013: Taxonomic study of the genus Ecpyrrhorrhoe Hübner (Lepidoptera: Crambidae: Pyraustinae) from China, with descriptions of three new species. Acta Zootaxonomica Sinica 38 (2): 311-316.
 , [1825] 1816, Verz. Bekannter Schmett. (Anz.) [1825] 1816: 356.
 , 2004, A review of Ecpyrrhorrhoe Hübner (Lepidoptera: Crambidae: Pyraustinae) from China, with descriptions of new species, Oriental Insects 38: 315-325.

Pyraustinae
Crambidae genera
Taxa named by Jacob Hübner